Just The Way You Are(originally titled The Bet) is a 2015 Filipino teen romantic comedy-drama film directed by Theodore Boborol, and written by Maan Dimaculangan-Fampulme and Ceres Helga Barrios, starring the hit ‘Forevermore’ tandem of Enrique Gil and Liza Soberano. The film is based on the best-selling Pop Fiction book ‘‘The Bet’’ which was originally published on Wattpad by Kimberly Joy Villanueva (ilurvbooks).

Synopsis
In love, the stakes are high. When you live for no one... or when you have almost no one... will you still bet your all?

The story follows a popular guy named Drake Sison (Enrique Gil), who makes a bet with his best friend Andrei (Yves Flores), to make the nerdy transfer student, Sophia Taylor (Liza Soberano), fall in love with him in 30 days. Once she falls for him, he must confess that it was all a bet.

Cast

Main cast

Enrique Gil as Drake "Draky" Sison
Liza Soberano as Sophia "Pie" Taylor
Yayo Aguila as Tita Veronica / Tita V
Yves Flores as Andre
Sue Ramirez as Driana Sison
Alex Diaz as Marcus
Jon Lucas as Ivan
Chienna Filomeno as Cassidy

Supporting cast 
Myrtle Sarrosa as Bea
Miguel Vergara as Matt
Anjo Damiles as Ricky
Marco Gumabao as Skye
Erin Ocampo as Chloe
Kyra Custodio as Jamie

Special participation
Tonton Gutierrez as Theodore Sison
Sunshine Cruz as Cecilia Sison
Ricky Davao as Arthur Taylor
Maris Racal as Amy (cameo)

Soundtracks
The theme song of the movie is called "Smile In Your Heart", an OPM classic given a fresh take by Filipino all-male group, Harana. The song was originally sung by Jam Morales and then by Ariel Rivera. Liza Soberano & Enrique Gil recorded a cover of the same theme song.

Box office
The film earned  on its first day of showing. This was revealed by Star Cinema's Advertising and Promotions Manager Mico del Rosario through his Twitter post on, June 29.

Awards and nominations

See also
List of Philippine films based on Wattpad stories

References

External links

2015 films
Philippine coming-of-age films
Philippine romantic comedy films
2015 romantic comedy films
2010s Tagalog-language films
2010s English-language films
Star Cinema films
2015 multilingual films
Philippine multilingual films